Butterfly is a 2015 Argentine drama film directed by Marco Berger. It was screened in the Panorama section of the 65th Berlin International Film Festival.

Cast
 Javier De Pietro
 Ailín Salas
 Malena Villa
 Jorge Díez
 María Laura Cali
 Justo Calabria
 Julian Infantino
 Pilar Fridman

See also
List of lesbian, gay, bisexual or transgender-related films of 2015

References

External links
 

2015 films
2015 drama films
2015 LGBT-related films
2010s Spanish-language films
Argentine drama films
Films directed by Marco Berger
Argentine LGBT-related films
LGBT-related drama films
2010s Argentine films